UCP may refer to:

Education
 , a university in Brazil
 , a university in Portugal
 University Centre Peterborough, a university centre in the United Kingdom
 University of Central Punjab, a university in Pakistan
 University of Cuenca del Plata
 An epithet denoting the Culture Collection of Catholic University of Pernambuco, Recife, Brazil

Other organizations
 Union of Communist Parties, an organization for communist political parties in the countries of the former USSR
 United Cattle Products, a chain of shops and restaurants in the North of England, most famous for the sale of tripe.
 United Cerebral Palsy, a philanthropic coalition for persons with disabilities
 United Communist Party (Russia)
 United Conservative Party, a provincial political party in Alberta, Canada
 United Country Party, former name of the National Party of Australia
 Universal Content Productions, a television production company
 University of Chicago Press

Other use
 HK UCP, a double-action handgun by Heckler & Koch
 Ubuntu Certified Professional, an LPI-based certification
 Uncoupling protein
 Unified Command Plan
 Uniform Customs and Practice for Documentary Credits, an international standard for drawing up letters of credit
 Universal Camouflage Pattern, a digital pattern of the U.S. Army
 Universal Computer Protocol, a protocol used to connect to SMS services
 Universal Connection Pool, Oracle database feature
 Use Case Points, a software estimation technique used to forecast the software size for software development projects
 User Control Panel
 Microcontact printing (μCP)

See also